Samuel Masury (ca. 1818–1874) was a photographer in 19th-century Boston, Massachusetts. He trained with photographer John Plumbe around 1842. In 1853-1855 he partnered with G.M. Silsbee as "Masury & Silsbee", daguerreotypists, on Washington Street.  Masury "traveled to Paris in 1855 to learn the glass negative process from the Bisson brothers, whose landscapes and architectural views were internationally celebrated." By 1858 he ran his own studio in Boston, on Washington Street. He presented work in the 1860 exhibition of the Massachusetts Charitable Mechanic Association.

References

External links

 WorldCat. Masury, Samuel
  (includes info related to Masury)

19th-century American photographers
1810s births
1874 deaths
Artists from Boston
19th century in Boston
Photographers from Massachusetts